Wellington Township is one of the eighteen townships of Lorain County, Ohio, United States. As of the 2010 census the population was 6,222, of whom 1,420 lived in the unincorporated portion of the township.

Geography
Located in southern Lorain County, it borders the following townships:
Pittsfield Township - north
LaGrange Township - northeast corner
Penfield Township - east
Spencer Township, Medina County - southeast corner
Huntington Township - south
Rochester Township - southwest corner
Brighton Township - west
Camden Township - northwest corner

The village of Wellington is located in central Wellington Township.

Name and history
It is the only Wellington Township statewide.

Government
The township is governed by a three-member board of trustees, who are elected in November of odd-numbered years to a four-year term beginning on the following January 1. Two are elected in the year after the presidential election and one is elected in the year before it. There is also an elected township fiscal officer, who serves a four-year term beginning on April 1 of the year after the election, which is held in November of the year before the presidential election. Vacancies in the fiscal officership or on the board of trustees are filled by the remaining trustees.

References

External links

County website

Townships in Lorain County, Ohio
Townships in Ohio